Admiral Richard Edwards (c. 1715 – 3 February 1795) naval officer and colonial governor of Newfoundland.

Naval career
Edwards was promoted to lieutenant in 1740 and to captain in 1753. He was appointed governor of Newfoundland for his first term in 1757. His main concern was defence of the colony as Great Britain and France were at war. Edwards was re-appointed governor for a second term in 1779 and was again concerned with the colony's defences – only this time against American privateers. In 1780 he formed the Newfoundland Volunteers under the command of Robert Pringle. Edwards ordered the construction of Fort Townshend (see Lord Townshend) and the Quidi Vidi batteries including those at Petty Harbour. Promoted vice-admiral in 1787, he became in Commander-in-Chief, The Nore in 1788. He was promoted to Admiral of the Blue in 1794.

See also 
 Governors of Newfoundland
 List of people from Newfoundland and Labrador

References

External links 
Biography at Government House The Governorship of Newfoundland and Labrador

|-

1710s births
1795 deaths
Governors of Newfoundland Colony
Royal Navy admirals
Year of birth uncertain
People from the City of Canterbury